A crown is often an emblem of a sovereign state, usually a monarchy (see The Crown), but also used by some republics.

A specific type of crown is employed in heraldry under strict rules. Indeed, some monarchies never had a physical crown, just a heraldic representation, as in the constitutional kingdom of Belgium.

Crowns are also often used as symbols of religious status or veneration, by divinities (or their representation such as a statue) or by their representatives, e.g. the Black Crown of the Karmapa Lama, sometimes used a model for wider use by devotees.

A crown can be a charge in a coat of arms, or set atop the shield to signify the status of its owner, as with the coat of arms of Norway.

Physical and heraldic crowns
Sometimes, the crown commonly depicted and used in heraldry differs significantly from any specific physical crown that may be used by a monarchy.

As a display of rank
If the bearer of a coat of arms has the title of baron or higher (or hereditary knight in some countries), he or she may display a coronet of rank above the shield, usually below the helm in British heraldry, and often above the crest (if any) in Continental heraldry.

In this case, the appearance of the crown or coronet follows a strict set of rules. A royal coat of arms may display a royal crown, such as that of Norway. A princely coat of arms may display a princely crown, and so on.

Naval, civic, mural and similar crowns
A mural crown is commonly displayed on coats of arms of towns and some republics. Other republics may use a so-called people's crown or omit the use of a crown altogether. The heraldic forms of crowns are often inspired by the physical appearance of the respective country's actual royal or princely crowns.

Ships and other units of some navies have a naval crown, composed of the sails and sterns of ships, above the shield of their coats of arms. Squadrons of some air forces have an astral crown, composed of wings and stars. There is also the Eastern crown, made up of spikes, and when each spike is topped with a star, it becomes a celestial crown.

Whereas most county councils in England use mural crowns, there is a special type of crown that was used by Scottish county councils. It was composed of spikes, was normally shown vert (green) and had golden wheat sheaves between the spikes. Today, most of the Scottish unitary authorities still use this "wheat sheaf crown", but it is now the usual gold.

Commonwealth usage

In formal English, the word crown is reserved for the crown of a monarch and the Queen consort, whereas the word coronet is used for all other crowns used by members of the British royal family and peers of the realm.

In the British peerage, the design of a coronet shows the rank of its owner, as in German, French and various other heraldic traditions. The coronet of a duke has eight strawberry leaves, that of a marquess has four strawberry leaves and four silver balls (known as "pearls", but not actually pearls), that of an earl has eight strawberry leaves and eight "pearls" raised on stalks, that of a viscount has sixteen "pearls", and that of a peerage baron or (in Scotland) lord of parliament has six "pearls". Between the 1930s and 2004, feudal barons in the baronage of Scotland were granted a chapeau or cap of maintenance as a rank insignia. This is placed between the shield and helmet in the same manner as a peer's coronet. Since a person entitled to heraldic headgear customarily displays it above the shield and below the helm and crest, this can provide a useful clue as to the owner of a given coat of arms.

Members of the British royal family have coronets on their coats of arms, and they may wear physical versions at coronations. They are according to regulations made by King Charles II in 1661, shortly after his return from exile in France (getting a taste for its lavish court style; Louis XIV started monumental work at Versailles that year) and Restoration, and they vary depending upon the holder's relationship to the monarch. Occasionally, additional royal warrants vary the designs for individuals.

In Canadian heraldry, special coronets are used to designate descent from United Empire Loyalists. A military coronet signifies ancestors who served in Loyalist regiments during the American Revolution, while a civil coronet is used by all others. The loyalist coronets are used only in heraldry, never worn.

Continental usages

Precisely because there are many traditions and more variation within some of these, there are a plethora of continental coronet types. Indeed, there are also some coronets for positions that do not exist, or do not entitle use of a coronet, in the Commonwealth tradition.

Such a case in French heraldry of the Ancien Régime, where coronets of rank did not come into use before the 16th century, is the vidame, whose coronet (illustrated) is a metal circle mounted with three visible crosses. (No physical headgear of this type is known.)

Helmets are often substitutes for coronets, and some coronets are worn only on a helmet.

Andorra

Bulgaria

France

Ancien Régime

Napoleonic Empire

July Monarchy

Georgia

German-speaking countries

Holy Roman Empire

Liechtenstein

Austria

Austrian Empire

Germany

German Empire

Hanover

Greece

Hungary

Croatia

Italy

Kingdom of Italy (1861-1946)

Kingdoms of Naples, Sicily, Two Sicilies

Grand Duchy of Tuscany

Other Italian states before 1861

Low Countries

Netherlands

Belgium
The older crowns are often still seen in the heraldry of older families.

Luxembourg

Monaco

Poland and Lithuania

Portuguese-speaking countries

Portugal

Kingdom of Portugal (until 1910)

Brazil

Empire of Brazil

Romania

Kingdom of Romania

Russia

Nordic countries

Denmark

Finland 
During the Swedish reign, Swedish coronets were used. Crowns were used in the coats of arms of the historical provinces of Finland. For Finland Proper, Satakunta, Tavastia and Karelia, it was a ducal coronet, for others, a comital coronet. In 1917 with independence, the coat of arms of Finland was introduced with a grand ducal crown, but it was soon removed, in 1920. Today, some cities use coronets, e.g. Pori has a mural crown and Vaasa a Crown of Nobility.

Norway

Sweden

Serbia

Spanish-speaking countries

Spain

Mexico

Chile

Non-European usages

Bahrain

Bhutan

Cambodia

Central African Empire

China

Egypt before 1953

Jordan

Morocco

Oman

Siam and Thailand

Tonga

Other examples

Ecclesiastical Hats

Anglican Communion

Catholic Church

Eastern Orthodox Church

Multinational

As a charge
In heraldry, a charge is an image occupying the field of a coat of arms. Many coats of arms incorporate crowns as charges. One notable example of this lies in the Three Crowns of the arms of Sweden.

Additionally, many animal charges (frequently lions and eagles) and sometimes human heads also appear crowned.  Animal charges gorged (collared) of an open coronet also occur, though more often as supporters than as charges.

See also

Crown jewels
Imperial crown
List of monarchies
Coronet

Notes

References

 
Heraldic charges